Big Brother 2004, also known as Big Brother 5, was the fifth series of the British reality television series Big Brother. The show followed thirteen contestants, known as housemates, who were isolated from the outside world for an extended period of time in a custom built House. Each week, one or more of the housemates were eliminated from the competition and left the House. The last remaining housemate, Nádia Almada, was declared the winner, winning a cash prize of £63,500.

The series launched on Channel 4 on 28 May 2004 and ended on 6 August 2004. It lasted 71 days - the longest series of Big Brother at the time and the eighth longest series to date. Davina McCall returned as presenter for her fifth consecutive year. Twelve housemates entered on launch night, with one additional housemate being introduced in the fifth week.

Following the negative reception of the "boring" previous series, several changes were made to the format. Big Brother became "evil", resulting in a higher-pressure environment for the housemates, more difficult tasks, fewer luxuries and more twists. Big Brother 5 ultimately became most memorable, and the subject of viewer complaints and press attention, for a physical altercation between housemates in the early hours of Day 20, which later became referred to by fans and in the press as "Fight Night".

The series was watched by an average of 5.1 million viewers, the second highest viewed series of the show to date (after Big Brother 3).

Production

Auditions
For the first time ever, housemates were selected via open auditions rather than via home video. The open audition process would go on to feature in each subsequent series until the thirteenth series in 2012.

Format

The series followed the same format as previous series of the programme. Twelve housemates lived in isolation from the outside world in a custom built house for a period of 71 days, hoping to be the last one to leave the house as the winner, and walk away with a large cash prize.

Promoted as "Big Brother goes evil", Big Brother 5 saw numerous changes occurring to the game. The main twist this series was that the grand prize had been increased to £100,000 for the winner, but was gradually taken away as the series went on based on Housemates' performances in various tasks. Nádia Almada, as the winner of the series, received a total of £63,500, meaning that the housemates lost £36,500 across the series. This series also became known for featuring the Big Brother Bedsit, into which Michelle and Emma were sent, unknown to the other housemates, when "evicted" from the house. Whilst in the Bedsit, they had a live feed of the house, which aired in the room non-stop for their viewing pleasure. They were granted access back into the house after five days. Yet another change in the format occurred on Day 69, when the Housemate with the fewest votes to win, was secretly evicted from the house through the Diary Room. This meant that only four Housemates would appear at the final, instead of five.

Broadcasts
The series premiered on 28 May 2004, on Channel 4. The contestants were recorded 24 hours a day with cameras fixed around the house, and had to wear portable microphones. Big Brother 5 was the third of the main series to feature a live launch. The launch night saw Davina give a house tour, as well as discuss rumors that had been going on about the series. She then introduced the new Housemates, and they entered the house live.

Channel 4 broadcast a daily highlights show, and from the first week there was a live eviction show hosted by Davina McCall, where the evicted housemate was interviewed. In the nightly highlight episodes, viewers are shown various highlights of a specific day in the house. Big Brother 5 saw the return of the psychiatrists providing commentary on events in the game, with the episodes featuring them being the highlights show after the most recent eviction. The live eviction episode was held on Friday, with a pre-eviction episode and an official eviction episode being held with a 30-minute gap between them. The series ended on 6 August 2004, lasting for a total of 71 days. This made it the longest season of the series at the time.

Spin-off programme Big Brother's Little Brother returned for a fourth year and second year on Channel 4, and was hosted once again by Dermot O'Leary. Live coverage continued to be a major part of E4's daily and nightly schedule.

The Saturday Night Live spin-off series, first introduced in Big Brother 3, saw Housemates competing in live tasks. It would last until midway through this, when it was axed due to poor ratings.

A new spin-off programme entitled Big Brother's E-Fourum, a nod to the network, was hosted by comedian Russell Brand, and featured an audience and viewer discussion and debate on housemates and events going on inside the house. The latter programme returned in subsequent series under a retooled format and was renamed Big Brother's Big Mouth. E4 once again screened Nominations Uncut on Tuesdays featuring extended nominations. Another new show Diary Room Uncut was broadcast on Thursday evening, featuring extra material from the Diary Room, if no nominations took place,  Diary Room Uncut would be shown in place of Nominations Uncut.

Prizes

The thirteen Housemates in the game are competing for the grand prize, which eventually amounted to £63,500. Each week, the Housemates attempted to complete various tasks assigned by Big Brother in exchange for a weekly budget, which they used to buy food and luxuries; this included buying things such as alcohol and cigarettes.

House

The Big Brother house has been located at Elstree Studios, Borehamwood, Hertfordshire since Big Brother 3 onward. To go along with the format change of the "evil" Big Brother this year, the house was much smaller in size. The house was one-third smaller, and featured an elevated floor and a lowered ceiling, adding a feeling of claustrophobia. The kitchen remained simple, with only necessities such as an oven (on which the only reference of time was located in the entire house), fridge, and sink. There was only one bedroom, and housemates were required to go through the garden to get to the bedroom. With eight single beds and two double beds, housemates were forced to share beds, and when a Housemate was evicted from the series, their bed was removed from the house, effectively preventing bed swapping. The showers in the bathroom this season were made of glass which led out into the garden, thus providing Housemates with no privacy. The Diary Room this season featured a red and blue background, with a large red chair which was attached to the wall. Big Brother 5 was the first series to not feature the chickens in the backyard. The house for this series was later described as being "horrible", with a member of production stating it was "designed to be as uncomfortable as possible, with none of the luxury gadgets of previous years."

Bedsit
Located behind the Diary Room, the bedsit contains one double bed, a small kitchen, a small bathroom, tattered armchairs, a telephone and flowery wallpaper, the only modern feature of the bedsit is the plasma screen where housemates can view the main house. Outside the bedsit is a corridor leading to the Diary Room. Due to the close proximity of the bedsit to the main house, housemates were required to speak quietly in the bedsit to avoid detection. The bedsit was resurrected six years later in Ultimate Big Brother.

Housemates

Weekly summary

Nominations table

Notes

: There were no nominations in Week 1; on Day 2, housemates were instead asked to nominate one person who they felt was least deserving of their suitcase. Kitten - despite refusing to participate - received the most votes and did not receive her suitcase for the rest of her stay in the house. Kitten was later ejected by Big Brother on Day 8 after constant rule breaking; Kitten was deemed on the show to be the first person evicted from the house, however, this is technically an ejection, as she was not voted out via a public nor an internal house vote.
: The housemates were told there was a double eviction. In reality, the public voted for which two housemates would enter a secret Big Brother Bedsit, where the two evictees would live for five days, be able to watch their fellow housemates on a television screen, and then return to the house, still eligible to win the prize money. Emma and Michelle received the most votes and moved into the Bedsit. Initially planned for Week 1, the Bedsit twist was postponed one week due to Kitten's ejection from the house. 
: Emma and Michelle made their nominations from the Bedsit. The other housemates could not nominate them, assuming them to be evicted.
: Due to the fallout from the fighting on Day 20 and Emma’s ejection from the house on Day 23, Week 3’s eviction was postponed until Week 4. There were thus no nominations in Week 4, and Daniel and Vanessa remained the nominees for eviction.
: As a new housemate, Becki could not be nominated by her fellow housemates, and believed she could not nominate. However, Big Brother told her that she had to nominate one housemate, who would automatically face eviction, by kissing them on both cheeks. If she didn't do this, she would automatically face eviction. Becki kissed Michelle, meaning she was up for eviction against the two housemates with the most nominations, Marco and Nádia.
: As punishment for constant discussion of nominations, Jason and Victor were banned from nominating.
: There were no nominations in Week 8; the weekly army-themed task determined instead who would face the public vote. Sergeants Jason and Michelle were made privy to the nominations twist. If the privates passed the task, all six privates would face eviction. If the privates failed, sergeants would face eviction. The Privates passed, meaning the six of them faced eviction.
: There were no nominations in Week 9. Instead, all housemates automatically faced eviction.
: There were no nominations in the final week. On Day 69, a vote count was done and the housemate with the least public votes to win secretly left the house in a surprise eviction during a party. Stuart was evicted, leaving Daniel, Jason, Nádia and Shell in the final four.

Suitcase voting

Kitten refused to vote and therefore cast a vote against herself. Even if she did vote, she would still not receive her suitcase.

Viewership
These viewing figures are taken from BARB.

"Fight Night"
On Day 20 in the House, a series of altercations began in the House, which eventually escalated and became physical. The incident was subsequently referred to as "Fight Night" by the press, by fans of the show, and, in a live episode the night after the incident was shown, by presenter Davina McCall.

Background
On Day 15, Emma and Michelle were sent to a secret room in the House named "the Bedsit" as part of a fake eviction. They were given access to live streaming from the House, were able to observe housemates' conversations and play pranks on them. Under the impression that they had been evicted, some of the remaining housemates spoke poorly of Emma and Michelle.

On 16 June, which was Day 20 in the House, Emma and Michelle were returned to the House from the Bedsit. Upon their return, the housemates were provided with fancy dress costumes, party food and alcohol.

Incident
In the early hours of 17 June, some of the housemates engaged in a playful food fight, leaving the communal living area in a mess. When Jason insisted that they tidy up their mess, Marco refused, prompting an argument between the pair. Nádia and Emma intervened in defence of Marco, with Nádia flipping over a table and, at one point, she slapped Jason.

The argument continued to escalate, with Emma and Victor squaring up to each other. Emma and Victor began throwing more food at each other, with Emma eventually throwing an empty tray at him. When Victor retaliated by throwing the same tray at Emma, hitting her in the back of the head, she raced towards him, and a scuffle ensued, while other housemates attempted to separate them. Big Brother repeatedly called Victor to the Diary Room and, as Stuart attempted to get him to comply, Emma was physically carried to the bedroom by Dan, whilst she screamed "I'll fucking kill you" at Victor.

The arguments led to Shell becoming very emotional, and she hid in the bathroom where she was comforted by Vanessa. Nádia entered the bathroom with the intent of apologising for upsetting Shell, but ended up having an argument with Vanessa.

At the beginning of the altercations, Big Brother placed security guards into the camera runs surrounding the House. Approximately twenty minutes after the altercations began, Big Brother sent the guards into the House via the bedroom. Housemates were then separated and monitored throughout the night by guards stationed within the House.

Response within the House
The events of the night led Jason to decide to walk from the game, though he was later talked out of it. Emma was placed back in the Bedsit, in an attempt to separate her from the rest of the housemates. Housemates Jason, Marco, Nádia, Vanessa, and Victor were all given formal warnings by Big Brother as a result of their behaviour during the incident.

Due to the incident, the planned eviction for Day 22 was postponed until the following week; Daniel and Vanessa still remained nominated for eviction. On Day 23, after spending two days in the Bedsit, Emma was officially ejected from the House by Big Brother. In a statement released by the show, which was also read to the housemates, Big Brother clarified that there was no suggestion that she was "any more to blame" than anyone else for the incident, but that reintroducing her to the House "may [have increased] the risk of a repeat incident".

Public reaction, broadcaster response and aftermath
The event caused much controversy outside the House. Some of the incident was streamed live on Channel 4's sister channel E4, and online. Once the major scuffle between Emma and Victor ensued, the video stream cut to a "safety shot" of the garden. However, the audio continued, and screaming, shouting, glass breaking and Big Brother's repeated requests for Victor to come to the Diary Room could be heard. At approximately 2am, live streaming was suspended, and did not resume until 3:06am. A number of viewers of the live streaming called the police over the incident, who arrived at the scene and requested a tape of the event. A spokeswoman for the Hertfordshire Constabulary stated: "Our officers are currently in liaison with members of the Big Brother production team to see whether further action needs to be taken."

The incident led to backlash from viewers, who criticized Channel 4. At 6pm on 17 June, Channel 4 and Endemol issued the following statement:

The welfare and safety of the housemates is always our overriding concern, and with that in mind, the production team decided to intervene last night at a point where they felt the confrontation between the housemates had reached an unacceptable level. Our on site security team diffused  the confrontation and the housemates were calmed down and sent to bed. The Big Brother production team has been talking to all housemates individually over the course of today with a view to sorting out tensions in the house and are closely monitoring them. They will be encouraging the housemates to work through their issues as a group. If they do not feel this is feasible they will consider an alternative course of action to guarantee the welfare of the housemates. As always, professional psychologists are monitoring the situation and are on hand if any of the housemates wish to speak to them. The local police have made enquiries about events in the house last night following a handful of calls from members of the public. At present they have given us no indication of any issues arising from last night's broadcast.

Professor David Wilson, a criminologist working as a consultant on the series, decided to leave Big Brother.

On 19 June, two days after the incident, Hertfordshire Constabulary released a joint statement with Channel 4 and Endemol, noting that they were "happy with the steps that Channel 4 and Endemol have taken since [the incident] to guarantee the safety of the housemates".

Media regulator Ofcom received over 300 complaints from viewers about the incident. After conducting an investigation, they concluded that the highlights show had been "appropriately edited and scheduled", and had therefore not breached the Broadcasting Code. However, they also concluded that the live streaming of the event had breached the Code. They opined that "Channel 4 was continuing to treat as entertainment, a situation that had, from what viewers could see, become serious", and "the intensity and repetition of verbal and physical violence exceeded viewers’ expectations".

On the same day as Ofcom's adjudication was published, Channel 4 responded, stating: "The producers at the Elstree studio were very confident that the situation in the house was under their control [...] they decided that the events in the house should be relayed to viewers until the shouting had abated to reassure viewers that the outcome was not as bad as they might otherwise have imagined. Ofcom took a different view and we must accept their decision."

The fight was later spoofed on the MTV series TRL, during which Emma, Marco, Vanessa, and Victor were present.

Legacy
Since their appearance on Big Brother 5, numerous housemates have gone on to appear in later editions of the programme. Housemates Kitten, Marco, and Victor all appeared on the spin-off series Big Brother Panto in 2004, along with housemates from the previous four editions. Housemate Michelle later appeared on Big Brother 10 to participate in a task celebrating ten years of the programme. Housemates Nádia, Michelle, and Victor were all official housemates on Ultimate Big Brother in 2010, with Nádia and Michelle being the third and fourth evicted housemates, respectively. Victor made it to the finale of the season, where he came in fourth place. Housemates Ahmed and Marco both made appearances in that series, though they were not competing to win.

References

External links
Big Brother - Series 5 at Channel4.com

2004 British television seasons
5
Television shows shot at Elstree Film Studios